Aiden McFadden (born September 28, 1998) is an American soccer player who plays as a winger for USL Championship club Atlanta United 2.

Career

College and amateur
McFadden played four years of college soccer at University of Notre Dame between 2017 and 2020, although missing the 2017 season due to injury. During his time with the Fighting Irish, McFadden made 55 appearances, scoring 8 goals and tallying 6 assists.

In 2018, McFadden also appeared for NPSL side West Chester United.

Professional
On January 21, 2021, McFadden was selected 59th overall in the 2021 MLS SuperDraft by Atlanta United. On April 21, 2021, McFadden signed with Atlanta's USL Championship side Atlanta United 2. He made his debut on April 24, 2021, starting against Louisville City.

On March 5, 2022, McFadden was called up to the Atlanta United first team squad, and made a 90th-minute substitute appearance during a 0–3 loss to Colorado Rapids.

On July 8, 2022, McFadden moved permanently to the Atlanta first team roster.

References

1998 births
Living people
American soccer players
Association football midfielders
Atlanta United 2 players
Atlanta United FC draft picks
Atlanta United FC players
Major League Soccer players
National Premier Soccer League players
Notre Dame Fighting Irish men's soccer players
Soccer players from Pennsylvania
USL Championship players